Vanessa Marie Bryant (previously Laine; born Vanessa Urbieta Cornejo; May 5, 1982) is a businesswoman, philanthropist and model. She was married to basketball player Kobe Bryant. They founded the Kobe and Vanessa Bryant Foundation in 2007 to provide scholarships to minority college students worldwide. Bryant leads the Mamba and Mambacita Sports Foundation to support child athletes who are in need. She is the president and chief executive officer of Granity Studios and a member of the board of directors of Bodyarmor SuperDrink.

Early life 
Bryant was born on May 5, 1982, in Los Angeles, California. She is of Mexican descent. Her parents divorced when she was a baby. After her parents' divorce, her biological father moved to Baja California. She has an older sister, Sophie. Her mother was a shipping clerk at an electronics company. In 1990, her mother married Stephen Laine, who was a middle manager at the same electronics company that she worked in. She began going by Laine after the marriage and officially changed her name to Vanessa Marie Laine in 2000, despite never officially being adopted by her step-father.

Her family's home was in Garden Grove, California, and she resided with her step-grandfather Robert Laine in Huntington Beach, California. She attended Marina High School.

In August 1999, Bryant and her friend Rowena Ireifej attended a hip-hop concert at the Irvine Meadows Amphitheatre. They were approached by a company and offered work as music video extras and backup dancers. Bryant later appeared in music videos for artists including Krayzie Bone and Snoop Dogg. Her mother chaperoned her on the shoots. In November 1999, Bryant met her future husband Kobe Bryant on the set of the music video for the song "G'd Up." The high-profile relationship caused disruptions at her high school, leading Bryant to complete her senior year at home as an independent study. She graduated from high school in 2000 with honors.

Career and philanthropy 

In 2007, Bryant and her husband founded the VIVO Foundation which was later renamed the Kobe and Vanessa Bryant Foundation. It is a charity that supports increasing a global perspective among young people. It provides scholarships for minority college students and other youth worldwide. The charity has collaborated with the Make-A-Wish Foundation.

Bryant and her husband were founding donors of the National Museum of African American History and Culture.

In 2020, following her husband and second-oldest daughter's deaths, Bryant changed the name of her husband's Mamba Sports Foundation to the Mamba and Mambacita Sports Foundation in honor of her daughter. It supports poor child athletes. In May 2021, Bryant launched a Mambacita line of clothing in honor of her daughter Gianna. The line is in partnership with a female-owned brand, Dannijo and all proceeds go towards the Mambacita Sports Foundation.

Bryant was the president and chief executive officer of Granity Studios.

Bryant worked with Baby2Baby to provide support for women and children in poverty. At the Baby2Baby 10-year gala in November 2021, she received a philanthropy award.

On February 8, 2022, during the Sports Power Brunch: Celebrating the Most powerful Women in Sports, Bryant received the Be Your Own Champion Award for her leadership of the Mambacita Sports Foundation.

Personal life 
Six months after meeting, Laine and Kobe Bryant were engaged. Her engagement ring included a seven-carat diamond. They married on April 18, 2001. The private wedding ceremony was attended by approximately twelve people and was held at the St. Edward Roman Catholic Church in Dana Point, California. After the marriage, she took his last name, becoming Vanessa Marie Bryant.

In January 2003, Vanessa gave birth to her and Kobe's first child, Natalia.

During the 2003 sexual assault case against her husband, Bryant defended him, stating: "I know my husband made the mistake of adultery". A few days later, she received a $4 million eight-carat purple diamond ring leading to speculation that this was a gift for her support. According to David K. Wiggins, a professor of sport studies, her husband had commissioned the ring two months prior.

Bryant was a strong influence on her husband. She was the focus of speculation by tabloids. In 2004, Bryant accused Lakers player Karl Malone of acting inappropriately towards her. Malone later apologized while denying making a pass at her. Sports Illustrated published a story titled Vanessa-gate about "wife-poaching" by Malone. Other columnist described Bryant as the new Yoko Ono, and she was the subject of a Saturday Night Live parody. She was recognized by supporters for challenging the National Basketball Association culture of tolerance of tomcatting.

Due to an ectopic pregnancy, Bryant suffered a miscarriage in the spring of 2005. Her second daughter, Gianna Maria-Onore (also referred to as "Gigi"), was born in May 2006.

In 2009, Bryant was sued by her housekeeper, Maria Jimenez, who alleged that she verbally abused and humiliated her while she was working at their Newport Coast home. Bryant denied those allegations and countersued Jimenez for breach of a confidentiality agreement.

On December 16, 2011, Vanessa filed for divorce from Kobe, citing irreconcilable differences. This sparked speculation of financial ramifications for Kobe, with some estimating Vanessa would receive $75 million. Thirteen months later, the Bryants called off the divorce. In April 2016, David Wharton and Nathan Fenno of the Los Angeles Times described Bryant as a contradictory and "at times polarizing public figure".

In early December 2016, Bryant gave birth to a third daughter, Bianka Bella, and in January 2019 the Bryants announced they were expecting a fourth daughter. Their fourth and last child, named Capri Kobe, was born in June 2019.

On January 26, 2020, Bryant's husband and their daughter Gigi died in the Calabasas helicopter crash. She sued Los Angeles County for invasion of privacy and negligence due to taking pictures of the victims of the crash and improperly sharing them. A trial was set for February 22, 2022. In August 2022, she was awarded $16 million in damages related to the photos in the trial. Vanessa Bryant will donate the proceeds of her multi-million dollar payout she received from her lawsuit against Los Angeles County to the Mamba and Mambacita Sports Foundation. In February 2023, the case settled out of court with a total settlement of $28.85 million awarded to Bryant and her daughters, including the $15 million awarded to her in August and additional funds to settle potential claims from her daughters.

References

External links

 

1982 births
Living people
21st-century American businesspeople
21st-century American businesswomen
American female models
American nonprofit executives
American people of English descent
American people of German descent
American people of Irish descent
American people of Mexican descent
21st-century American philanthropists
American women company founders
Bryant family
Businesspeople from Los Angeles
Female models from California
Founders of charities
Hispanic and Latino American female models
Models from Los Angeles
Women nonprofit executives
21st-century women philanthropists